Brett Barry Storey (born 7 July 1977) is an English footballer who played in the Football League for Lincoln City.

Playing career
After beginning his career with Sheffield United, Storey joined Lincoln City making his Football League debut in the club's 2–1 home victory over Mansfield Town on 13 April 1996. His second, and final, appearance for the club saw him score in a 5–0 home victory over Torquay United on 4 May 1996.

He joined Matlock Town at the start of the 1997–98 season before moving on to join then Football Conference side Stalybridge Celtic. With Mel Sterland replacing Brian Kettle as manager, Storey found himself surplus to requirements at the Bower Fold based club and returned to Matlock Town in January 1998 before swiftly moving on to join Alfreton Town.

In August 1998 he linked up with Leigh RMI before returning to Alfreton Town at the end of September 1998.

On 5 July 2010, Storey signed for Staveley Miners Welfare after returning to England following a spell playing in Hong Kong for Shatin SA. He made his debut for the club in the 2–0 Northern Counties East League victory at Louth Town on 4 September 2010.

References

External links

Lincoln City F.C. Official Archive Profile

1977 births
Living people
English footballers
Association football midfielders
English Football League players
Hong Kong First Division League players
Lincoln City F.C. players
Stalybridge Celtic F.C. players
Matlock Town F.C. players
Alfreton Town F.C. players
Leigh Genesis F.C. players
Shatin SA players
Staveley Miners Welfare F.C. players
Sheffield United F.C. players